Lithoteng is a constituency and community council in the Maseru Municipality located in the Maseru District of Lesotho. The population in 2006 was 26,593.

Villages
The community of Lithoteng includes the villages of

Ha Keiso (Lithabaneng)Ha PhakalasaneHa RampeoaneHa SelesoHa SeoliKhotsong (Lithoteng)Lebung

Lebung (Ha Matala)Lefikeng (Lithabaneng)LithabanengLithotengMahlabatheng (Lithabaneng)

'MamenoanengNtšireleSemphetenyaneShalabengShalabeng (Lithoteng)

References

External links
 Google map of community villages

Populated places in Maseru District